Falaise is a commune in the Calvados department in the Normandy region in northwestern France.

Geography

History
The area around Falaise has been inhabited from prehistoric times, but it was only at the end of the prehistoric period and the beginning of the Gallo-Roman era that the area, Falaise in particular, was regularly inhabited. Evidence of settlement from the time has been found at Vaston, an agricultural area just north-east of the modern town.

Falaise, as it is sited today, probably came into being around the castle.

The town was the birthplace of William the Conqueror, first of the Norman Kings of England. He was frequently referred to as William the Bastard, on account of his being born out of wedlock to Herleva from Falaise, reputedly a tanner's daughter.

The Château de Falaise (12th–13th century), which overlooks the town from a high crag, was formerly the seat of the Dukes of Normandy. Also, the Treaty of Falaise was signed at the castle in December 1174 between the captive William I, King of Scots, and the Plantagenet King of England, Henry II.

The town was also the place that Rabbi Yom Tov of Falaise, grandchild of Rashi, held his rabbinical court.

On 26 October 1851, a statue of William the Conqueror was inaugurated here (at his place of birth).

World War II 

In modern times, it is known for the battle of the Falaise Pocket during the Allied reconquest of France (called Operation Overlord) in August 1944 in which two German armies were encircled and destroyed by the Allied armies. Some 10,000 German troops were killed and 50,000 taken prisoner.

Two-thirds of Falaise was destroyed by Allied bombing before the town was taken by a combined force of Canadian and Polish troops. Falaise was largely restored after the war.

Population

International relations

Falaise has been twinned with Henley-on-Thames in Oxfordshire, England, since 1974; Bad Neustadt an der Saale in Germany since 1969; Cassino in Italy since 1975; and Alma, Quebec in Canada since 1969.

See also
Communes of the Calvados department

References

External links

Castle William the Conqueror in Falaise, France. (Official website in English)
Normandieweb on Falaise (in French)
A Conqueror's change of heart Personal blog with good images of the William the Conqueror statue in Falaise

Communes of Calvados (department)
Calvados communes articles needing translation from French Wikipedia